Jean Marie Octave Constant Washer  (22 August 1894 – 23 March 1972) was a Belgian tennis player successful in the 1920s. He was the father of Philippe Washer.

Tennis career
Washer reached the semifinals of Roland Garros in 1925, beating Henri Cochet before losing to Jean Borotra.  Washer also reached the quarters in 1926; the quarterfinals of the 1924 Wimbledon Championships; and the final of the World Hard Court Championships in both 1921 and 1923.

He was ranked world No. 9 by A. Wallis Myers of The Daily Telegraph for 1923.

References

External links 
 
 
 
 

Belgian male tennis players
1894 births
1972 deaths
Olympic tennis players of Belgium
Tennis players at the 1920 Summer Olympics
Tennis players at the 1924 Summer Olympics
Sportspeople from Antwerp